An iodide ion is the ion I−. Compounds with iodine in formal oxidation state −1 are called iodides. In everyday life, iodide is most commonly encountered as a component of iodized salt, which many governments mandate. Worldwide, iodine deficiency affects two billion people and is the leading preventable cause of intellectual disability.

Structure and characteristics of inorganic iodides
Iodide is one of the largest monatomic anions. It is assigned a radius of around 206 picometers. For comparison, the lighter halides are considerably smaller: bromide (196 pm), chloride (181 pm), and fluoride (133 pm). In part because of its size, iodide forms relatively weak bonds with most elements.

Most iodide salts are soluble in water, but often less so than the related chlorides and bromides. Iodide, being large, is less hydrophilic compared to the smaller anions. One consequence of this is that sodium iodide is highly soluble in acetone, whereas sodium chloride is not. The low solubility of silver iodide and lead iodide reflects the covalent character of these metal iodides. A test for the presence of iodide ions is the formation of yellow precipitates of these compounds upon treatment of a solution of silver nitrate or lead(II) nitrate.

Aqueous solutions of iodide salts dissolve iodine better than pure water. This effect is due to the formation of the triiodide ion, which is brown:
I− + I2 ⇌

Redox, including antioxidant properties
Iodide salts are mild reducing agents and many react with oxygen to give iodine. A reducing agent is a chemical term for an antioxidant. Its antioxidant properties can be expressed quantitatively as a redox potential :

2I− ⇌  I2 +  E° = 0.54 volts (versus SHE)

Because iodide is easily oxidized, some enzymes readily convert it into electrophilic iodinating agents, as required for the biosynthesis of myriad iodide-containing natural products. Iodide can function as an antioxidant reducing species that can destroy ozone and reactive oxygen species such as hydrogen peroxide:
2 I− + peroxidase + H2O2 + tyrosine, histidine, lipid, etc. →  iodo-compounds + H2O + 2 e− (antioxidants).

Representative iodides

Natural occurrence
Iodargyrite—natural, crystalline silver iodide—is the most common iodide mineral currently known. Iodide anions may sometimes also be found combined with mercury, copper and lead, but minerals with such compositions are even more scarce.

Other oxyanions
Iodine can assume oxidation states of −1, +1, +3, +5, or +7. A number of neutral iodine oxides are also known.

References

External links
 
 

 
Anions
Dietary minerals
Dietary antioxidants
Leaving groups